The World U-17 Hockey Challenge, originally known as the Quebec Esso Cup, is an international ice hockey tournament held annually in Canada. Prior to 2011, the tournament did not operate during years in which the Canada Winter Games were held. As such, the World Under-17 Challenge was held three out of every four years.  It is organized by Hockey Canada and is the first major international competition for male hockey players under the age of 17.  The tournament is the first step in Hockey Canada's Program of Excellence and is used to identify players moving on to the U18 and National Junior Team.

Origins 
The inaugural World Under-17 Hockey Challenge took place in Quebec as the 1986 Quebec Esso Cup.  At the time, it was considered the unofficial world championship of midget hockey. It was also used as a development tool for the Canadian Amateur Hockey Association to identify players for further development as well as expose them to their first taste of international competition. The tournament was among ten teams, five regional teams from Canada, Finland, Czechoslovakia, the United States, Sweden, and the Soviet Union. Team Quebec, led by future NHL first overall pick Pierre Turgeon captured gold by defeating the Soviets, who featured the likes of Sergei Fedorov and Alexander Mogilny.

Prior to November 2014, the tournament was held from late December through to early January.  Originally, Canada would field five teams, selected on a regional basis.

Current tournament 

The World Under-17 Hockey Challenge has continued to grow over the years to the point where it is perhaps the largest annual event administered under Hockey Canada's own auspices.  Although the tournament is not sanctioned by the IIHF, it attracts U17 teams from the United States, Sweden, and Russia on an annual basis and Czech Republic, Finland, and Slovakia on a semi-annual basis.

The tournament is currently held in November of each year.

Participating teams 

Canada enters three teams each year.  Prior to November 2014, Canada entered five regional teams

Other participating nations have included:
 
 
 
 
 
 
 
  (now defunct)
  (now defunct)

Results

Medal table

Notable participants 
In bold, players selected first overall in the NHL entry draft

 Pierre Turgeon, Team Quebec, 1986
 Sergei Fedorov, Team USSR, 1986
 Alexander Mogilny, Team USSR, 1986
 Joe Sakic, Team Pacific, 1986
 Jeremy Roenick, Team USA, 1986
 Pavel Bure, Team Soviet Union, 1988
 Mats Sundin, Team Sweden, 1988
 Jere Lehtinen, Team Finland, 1990
 Sami Kapanen, Team Finland, 1990
 Martin Lapointe, Team Quebec, 1990
 Nikolai Khabibulin, Team USSR, 1990
 Chris Gratton, Team Ontario, 1992
 Ethan Moreau, Team Ontario, 1992
 Todd Harvey, Team Ontario, 1992
 Jamie Storr, Team Ontario, 1992
 Alexandre Daigle, Team Quebec, 1992
 Éric Dazé, Team Quebec, 1992
 Jocelyn Thibault, Team Quebec, 1992
 Radek Bonk, Team Czechoslovakia, 1992

 Viktor Kozlov, Team USSR, 1992
 Adam Deadmarsh, Team Pacific, 1992
 Darcy Tucker, Team Pacific, 1992
 Niklas Sundström, Team Sweden, 1992
 Daniel Brière, Team Quebec, 1994
 Jean-Sébastien Giguère, Team Quebec, 1994
 Jarome Iginla, Team Pacific, 1994
 Brad Larsen, Team Pacific, 1994
 Bryan Berard, Team USA, 1994
 Joe Thornton, Team Ontario, 1995
 Roberto Luongo, Team Quebec, 1995
 Patrick Marleau, Team West, 1995
 Brian Gionta, Team USA, 1995
 Scott Gomez, Team USA, 1995
 Martin Hyun, Team Germany, 1995
 Sascha Goc, Team Germany, 1995
 Mika Noronen, Team Finland, 1995
 Vincent Lecavalier, Team Quebec, 1996
 David Legwand, Team USA, 1996

 Duncan Keith, Team Pacific, 2000
 Ilya Kovalchuk, Team Russia, 2000
 Joni Pitkänen, Team Finland, 2000
 Ryan Kesler, Team USA, 2001
 Alexander Ovechkin, Team Russia, 2002
 Jack Johnson, Team USA, 2004
 Phil Kessel, Team USA, 2004
 Jonathan Toews, Team West, 2005
 Erik Johnson, Team USA, 2005
 Patrick Kane, Team USA, 2005
 Taylor Hall, Team Ontario, 2008
 Aaron Ekblad, Team Ontario, 2012
 Bo Horvat, Team Ontario, 2012
 Auston Matthews, Team USA, 2014
 Mitch Marner, Team Ontario, 2014
 Matthew Tkachuk, Team USA, 2014
 Andrei Svechnikov, Team Russia, 2015
 Brady Tkachuk, Team USA, 2015
 Jack Hughes, Team USA, 2017

See also
 World Junior A Challenge
 IIHF World U20 Championship
 IIHF World U18 Championship

Notes

References

External links
 World U-17 Hockey Challenge

 
Hockey Canada
International ice hockey competitions for junior teams
International ice hockey competitions hosted by Canada
Youth ice hockey in Canada